Furcifer monoceras is a species of chameleon endemic to Madagascar. It is only known from one holotype specimen from Betsako, east of Mahajanga. Long considered conspecific with the rhinoceros chameleon (F. rhinoceratus), a 2018 study of minor details of its morphology indicated that it was a distinct species.

References 

Furcifer
Endemic fauna of Madagascar
Reptiles described in 1913
Taxa named by Oskar Boettger